Telepathic Surgery is the third studio album by The Flaming Lips, released in 1989.

Overview
Telepathic Surgery began life as a concept album; the band initially set out to create a 30-minute sound collage. The plan was later scrapped; however, the remnants of this original idea are evident within the album's loose, meandering structure and the epic "Hell's Angel's Cracker Factory". The album is named after a line from the song "Chrome Plated Suicide".

"Chrome Plated Suicide" stands out as one of the group's most accomplished early recordings, possibly due to being based on Guns N' Roses' critically acclaimed "Sweet Child o' Mine". Sub Pop asked the group to record "Drug Machine in Heaven"  for their 'single of the month' series. It was retitled as "Drug Machine" and is the group's first official single. The 'A-side' was backed with "Strychnine/What's So Funny (About Peace, Love and Understanding)", a cover of "Strychnine" by The Sonics and "(What's So Funny 'Bout) Peace, Love, and Understanding" by Brinsley Schwarz, but based on the Elvis Costello and the Attractions cover version.

Similar to many albums of its time, the CD release of Telepathic Surgery had a track listing differing from its LP release due to the time restraints of a single vinyl LP. Extra tracks on CD versions were "Fryin' Up" and "Hell's Angel's Cracker Factory", which are included in between "Miracle on 42nd Street and "U.F.O. Story".

Reissue
The album was reissued and remastered as part of the Finally the Punk Rockers Are Taking Acid boxset in 2002, which included the extra tracks from the CD but "Hell's Angels Cracker Factory" was amended to just over three minutes in length.

Telepathic Surgery was reissued in limited quantities in 2005 on blue vinyl. The reissue is on 3 sides and contains the bonus track "Hell's Angels Cracker Factory", a 23-minute song with backward vocals and long guitar solos. The cover depicts promotional photos including the band standing in front of a staged fatal car crash. The inside sleeve contains a story about the early Lips by Michael Ivins, the bassist of the Flaming Lips.

Track listing

Original release

CD

Personnel
 Wayne Coyne – lead vocals, guitar
 Michael Ivins – bass, backing vocals
 Richard English – drums, backing vocals, keyboards
 Produced by The Flaming Lips
 Ruben Ayala – recording engineer
 Craig 'Niteman' Taylor – harmonica
 Michelle Martin – photography
 Michele Vlasimsky – layout design, photography

References

1989 albums
The Flaming Lips albums
Restless Records albums